Giannetto De Rossi (8 August 1942 – 11 April 2021) was an Italian makeup and special effects artist for motion pictures. His career included work for several high-profile directors, including Bernardo Bertolucci, Sergio Leone, Federico Fellini, Franco Zeffirelli, and David Lynch; as well as collaborations with cult filmmakers Lucio Fulci and Alexandre Aja. He was known particularly for his highly-detailed and realistic prosthetic appliances, most visible in his horror output. He was nominated for the BAFTA Award for Best Special Effects for the Oscar-winning The Last Emperor (1987).

Early career 
One of his first special FX roles was as make-up artist for Joe D'Amato, whose film Emanuelle in America required detailed special FX for the notorious snuff film sequences. The gruesome effects produced by De Rossi, which included a woman's breasts being hacked off and multiple floggings, were so convincing that many thought them real snuff film scenes, and one actress complained that she had been traumatised by the effects.

International fame 
Early in his career, De Rossi worked with a number of well-known Italian directors, including Sergio Leone and Federico Fellini. A particularly notable collaboration was with Lucio Fulci on his horror film Zombi 2. De Rossi also worked with Fulci in three other films:  City of the Living Dead, The Beyond and The House by the Cemetery.

Hollywood fame 
Dino De Laurentiis hired De Rossi to create the on-set practical effects for two films in Mexico which he was producing, Dune and Conan the Destroyer. De Rossi created a number of memorable effects in the two films, including the fetus-shaped Spice Guild Navigator seen floating in a tank in Dune and the Dagoth monster suit worn by André the Giant in Conan the Destroyer.

In the late 1980s he created the special makeup effects on Rambo III. For the scene in which Rambo heals himself by igniting gunpowder inside of a torso bullet wound, De Rossi rigged a device which caused flame to burst from both Sylvester Stallone's stomach and back at once.  Stallone was so impressed by De Rossi's work that he hired him again for the make-up effects for Daylight, which was shot in Rome and put Stallone's son Sage Stallone in contact with Lucio Fulci.  

De Rossi created the title monster in the film Killer Crocodile, and directed the film's sequel, Killer Crocodile 2.

He is also notable as the designer of the mask used in the film The Man in the Iron Mask.

Later years 
De Rossi continued creating FX for both Italian and American cinema, until his death on 11 April 2021 (coincidentally the same day as fellow Lucio Fulci collaborator Enzo Sciotti).

Filmography (makeup artist and special effects)

Christopher Roth (2010)(post-production)
The Last Legion (2007)
"Pompei" (2007) TV mini-series
Ring of the Nibelungs (2004)(TV)
Modigliani (2004)
Haute Tension (High Tension) (2003)
Uprising (2001) (TV)
Amici ahrarara (2001)
Harrison's Flowers (2000)
Vatel (2000)
Asterix et Obelix contre Cesar (1999)
The Man in the Iron Mask (1998)
Kull the Conqueror (1997)
Daylight (1996)
Dragonheart (1996)
Catherine the Great (1995)(TV)
The Inner Circle (1991)
Dr. M (1990)
Killer Crocodile (1989)
Rambo III (1988)
State buoni...se potete (1984)
Dune (1984)
Conan the Destroyer (1984)
I predatori di Atlantide (Atlantis Inferno) (1983)
La traviata (1983)
Piranha Par Two: The Spawning (1981)
Le Notti Del Terrore (a.k.a. Burial Ground) (1981)
Quella villa accanto al cimitero (The House by the Cemetery) (1981)
E tu vivrai nel terrore-L'aldila (The Beyond a.k.a. Seven Doors of Death) (1981)
Zombi Holocaust (Zombie Holocaust a.k.a. Dr. Butcher M.D.) (1980)
Apocalypse domani (Cannibal Apocalypse a.k.a. Cannibals in the Streets a.k.a. Invasion of the Fleshhunters) (1980)
City of the Living Dead (a.k.a. Gates of Hell) (1980)
Zombi 2 (Zombie a.k.a. Zombie Flesh Eaters) (1979)
L'umanoide (The Humanoid) (1979)
King of the Gypsies (1978)
Emanuelle in America (1977)
Il Casanova di Federico Fellini (Fellini's Casanova) (1976)
Cattivi pensieri (1976)
Novecento (1900)(1976)
Non si deve profanare il sonno dei morti (No profanar el sueno de los muertos a.k.a. The Living Dead at Manchester Morgue a.k.a. Let Sleeping Corpses Lie a.k.a. Don't Open the Window a.k.a. Do No Speak III of the Dead) (1974)
Mussolini: Ultimo atto (The Last 4 Days)(1974)
Ash Wednesday (1973)
Valdez, il mezzosangue (Chino) (1973)
II prode Anselmo e il suo scudiero (1972)
La piu bella serata della mia vita (1972)
 (The Senator Likes Women) (1972)
The Valachi Papers (1972)
Quando gli uomini armarono la clava e...con le donne fecero din-don (When Men Carried Clubs and Women Played Ding-Dong a.k.a. When Women Played Ding Dong) (1971)
Waterloo (1970)
Quando le donne avevano la coda (When Women Had Tails) (1970)
The Invincible Six (1970)
C'era una volta il West (Once Upon a Time in the West) (1968)
The Taming of the Shrew (1967)
Io, io, io...e gli altri (Me, Me, Me...and the Others) (1966)
Svegliati e uccidi (1966)
La donna del lago (The Possessed) (1965)
Cadavere per signora (Corpse for the Lady) (1964)
I maniaci (The Maniacs) (1964)
Obiettivo ragazze (1963)
Le ore della'amore (The Hours of Love) (1963)

Filmography (director and writer) 
Tummy (1995)
Killer Crocodile II (1990)
 (1989)

References

External links

1942 births
2021 deaths
Special effects people
Italian make-up artists
Italian artists
Italian film directors